Marla Ruzicka (December 31, 1976 – April 16, 2005) was an American activist-turned-aid worker.  She believed that combatant governments had a legal and moral responsibility to compensate the families of civilians killed or injured in military conflicts.

In 2003, Ruzicka founded the Campaign for Innocent Victims in Conflict (CIVIC), an organization that counted civilian casualties and assisted Iraqi victims of the 2003 US invasion of Iraq. In 2005, she was killed by a roadside bomb in Iraq.

Early life
Born in Lakeport, California, Ruzicka attended Long Island University's Friends World Program, and spent four years traveling throughout Costa Rica, Kenya, Cuba, Israel, and Zimbabwe.  After graduating in 1999, Ruzicka volunteered for the San Francisco-based organizations Rainforest Action Network and Global Exchange.

Afghanistan and Iraq
Prior to launching CIVIC in Iraq, she was based in Peshawar, Pakistan, and later Kabul, Afghanistan. Under the auspices of Global Exchange, she pressured the US government to set up a fund for Afghan families harmed in Operation Enduring Freedom. However, she soon struck out on her own to form CIVIC, and arrived in Kabul only a few days after the Taliban were removed from power. In Afghanistan, she began conducting a grassroots survey on the military campaign effects on Afghan civilians, in order to apply for compensation and aid. On April 7, 2002, she protested outside the U.S. Embassy in Kabul, alongside several civilians who had lost relatives as the result of U.S. air strikes.

In July 2002, Ruzicka began working with USAID and the Senate Appropriations Committee to allocate money to rebuild the homes of families that had suffered losses as a result of military action. After receiving CIVIC's first report, Senator Patrick Leahy (D-Vermont) sponsored legislation to provide $10 million in U.S. aid to Afghan civilians who had been harmed by the US military. He said, "Marla Ruzicka is out there saying, 'Wait, everybody. Here is what is really happening. You'd better know about this.' We have whistle blowers in industry. Maybe sometimes we need whistle blowers in foreign policy."

She traveled to Baghdad after the April 2003 U.S. invasion. CIVIC's efforts were featured on Nightline and CNN, as well as in The New York Times and Elle magazine. "With a shoestring budget, almost no staff and a bundle of energy, Ruzicka has already had more impact on more lives than many seasoned K Street lobbyists," The Washington Post reported in 2004. Ruzicka was diagnosed with bipolar disorder in the summer of 2004.

Death
Ruzicka and her Iraqi translator, Faiz Ali Salim, were killed by a suicide car bombing on the Baghdad Airport Road on April 16, 2005. More than 600 people attended her funeral in her hometown of Lakeport; Barbara Boxer and Sean Penn were among those who spoke at her memorial service. There were also memorial services in New York City, Washington, D.C., Baghdad, Kabul, and San Francisco.

According to Rolling Stone, "Ruzicka is perhaps the most famous American aid worker to die in any conflict of the past ten or twenty years. Though a novice in life—she had less than four years of professional humanitarian experience—her death resonated far beyond the tightly knit group of war junkies and policymakers who knew her. She stands as a youthful representative of a certain kind of not-yet-lost American idealism, and darkly symbolic of what has gone so tragically wrong in Iraq."

Marla Ruzicka left a one line will stating that her friend, war journalist Tara Sutton, would take care of CIVIC and appoint a new director.

At Senator Leahy's urging, President George W. Bush signed legislation on May 11, 2005, which renamed the civilian war victims the "Marla Ruzicka Iraqi War Victims Fund." As of 2006, the combined sum that Congress has allocated to assist Afghan and Iraqi civilians who were victims of U.S. warfare is thirty-eight million dollars.

Depiction in film media
Film rights to Ruzicka's life story were purchased by Paramount Pictures. The studio also bought the rights to the book Sweet Relief: The Marla Ruzicka Story by Jennifer Abrahamson, who had begun collaborating on the book with Ruzicka before her death. Kirsten Dunst agreed to play Ruzicka in the movie scripted by Lorene Scafaria.

Ruzicka appears briefly in the documentary Enron: The Smartest Guys in the Room as one of the protesters who disrupts Jeffrey Skilling's speech at The Commonwealth Club.

References

External links
Sweet Relief: The Marla Ruzicka Story, Biography published by Simon & Schuster
 CIVIC website
 Iraqi Civilian War Casualties,  The results of CIVIC's campaign in Iraq.
https://www.comune.re.it/Applicazioni/stradarioCAP.nsf/PESVieWeb/7EA1880ADE750DACC1257705003A6E51?opendocument, Municipality of Reggio Emilia new street dedication.

Magazines and newspapers

Independent, A legacy that puts so many to shame 
 The Globe and Mail, My friend died helping Iraqi civilians (Obituary by Mark MacKinnon)
Guardian,  Marla Ruzicka (Obituary)
 Lake County Record-Bee, Statement in honor of Marla Ruzicka - Senator Barbara Boxer transcript 04.18.05 
 Salon, Marla Ruzicka, RIP
Washington Post, Victims' Champion Is Killed in Iraq
The Washington Post, U.S. Activist Mends Lives Torn by War Compensation Sought For Victims' Families

Websites
 Alternet, Mourning Marla Intrepid humanitarian aid worker Marla Ruzicka died in Baghdad Saturday when her car was caught in an insurgent attack , Jill Carroll.
 Back to Iraq, Our Heart and Conscience - by  Iraq-based journalist Christopher Allbritton.
 Blogspot,  Marla Ruzicka (1976-2005) in memory of a global humanitarian, lost in the line of duty, A blog of memories from Marla's friends 
 IMDb,  - film about Marla's life  
 Google, Glimpses of Marla. A tribute by thefullmonte.com
 Uruknet, Remembering Marla Ruzicka
 Youtube, Remembering Marla.
NPR Podcast:Rough Translation, Home/Front

1976 births
2005 deaths
American anti-war activists
Terrorism deaths in Iraq
American humanitarians
Women humanitarians
American expatriates in Pakistan
People from Lakeport, California
Activists from California